Miguel Ángel Sánchez Muñoz, known as Míchel (born 30 October 1975), is a Spanish former footballer who played as a left midfielder, currently manager of Girona FC.

In a 20-year senior career, he amassed La Liga totals of 182 matches and 25 goals, adding 169 games and 18 goals in the Segunda División and playing mostly with Rayo Vallecano (17 seasons, three spells).

Playing career
Míchel was born in Madrid. A product of Rayo Vallecano's youth system, he appeared once for the first team in the 1993–94 season, then alternated between them and the reserves two more years.

After one loan to UD Almería in the Segunda División, Míchel returned to Rayo, being essential as the capital outskirts side finished ninth in the 1999–2000 campaign and qualified for the subsequent UEFA Cup through fair play, in a run that ended in the quarter-finals at the hands of fellow La Liga club Deportivo Alavés. The following season he scored a career-best ten goals in 33 games (all starts), as his team ranked 14th.

Míchel moved in 2003 to Real Murcia for a €2,7 million fee, being relatively used in his first year, which ended in top-division relegation. He appeared very rarely, however, in his final two seasons, which included a six-month loan spell with Málaga CF in 2004–05, where he was also sparingly used.

In July 2006, Míchel returned home and to Rayo, helping it return to the second tier in the 2007–08 season. He continued to be team captain and, during the 2010–11 campaign, still contributed with two goals in 20 matches as they returned to the top flight after eight years.

Coaching career
On 9 July 2012, after having appeared in only nine games as Rayo retained their league status – just 246 minutes of action – the 36-year-old Míchel retired from football, being immediately appointed coach of his main club's youth sides. On 21 February 2017, he replaced Rubén Baraja at the helm of the first team, eventually achieving promotion to the top division in the 2017–18 campaign as champions.

Míchel was dismissed on 18 March 2019, being subsequently replaced by Paco Jémez. On 1 June, he was named manager of SD Huesca, recently relegated to the second tier. He and his side won another promotion, again in the top position.

On 12 January 2021, as the team ranked in last place, Míchel was relieved of his duties. On 9 July, he signed as coach of Girona FC.

Managerial statistics

Honours

Manager
Rayo Vallecano
Segunda División: 2017–18

Huesca
Segunda División: 2019–20

References

External links

1975 births
Living people
Spanish footballers
Footballers from Madrid
Association football midfielders
La Liga players
Segunda División players
Segunda División B players
Tercera División players
Rayo Vallecano B players
Rayo Vallecano players
UD Almería players
Real Murcia players
Málaga CF players
Spain youth international footballers
Spanish football managers
La Liga managers
Segunda División managers
Rayo Vallecano managers
SD Huesca managers
Girona FC managers